W24 Calbourne is an example of the Adams LSWR O2 class 0-4-4T, which is based at the Isle of Wight Steam Railway. It is the sole survivor of its class.

History

One of 60 Adams O2 class 0-4-4T, it was built by the LSWR in 1891 at Nine Elms locomotive works and numbered LSWR 209. It was based at Fratton before moving on to Exeter. It passed into Southern Railway ownership in 1923. 

The locomotive was transferred to the Isle of Wight on 26 April 1925 as the island's locomotive stock needed major modernisation, it was re-numbered W24 and given the name Calbourne, after a village on the island. The locomotive was fitted with Westinghouse air brake equipment to allow it to haul island passenger carriages, and had an extension fitted to its coal bunker to increase its range of operation.

Calbourne remained on the island under British Railway ownership, and was retained after steam services ended, with W31 Chale, as a works engine for the Ryde to Shanklin line electrification, until withdrawal in March 1967 when electrification of the line was complete.

Calbourne was acquired by the Wight Locomotive Society in 1967 as the flagship locomotive of the Isle of Wight Steam Railway, where it can still be seen today. Calbourne is the only surviving O2 locomotive, the remainder having been scrapped.

Preservation

In 1967 the Wight Locomotive Society acquired Calbourne from British Railways and it spent its early years in Southern Railway Malachite Green with Sunshine lettering. After an overhaul in 1992 it was repainted in Southern Railway Maunsell lined Olive Green with an unmodified coal bunker. Calbourne was withdrawn in 2002 for overhaul re-emerging in 2010 in BR Standard Mixed-Traffic Black livery with red and white lining and the larger bunker re-fitted.

Livery

LSWR
 LSWR passenger Yellow Ochre/Brown livery with the initials 'LSW' on the water tank sides.

Southern Railway
 Maunsell lined Olive Green.
 Wartime plain black with Sunshine lettering
 Malachite Green with Sunshine lettering.

British Railways

 BR Standard Mixed-Traffic Black livery with red and white lining.

Preservation

 Unlined BR Black
 Malachite Green with Sunshine lettering.
 Maunsell lined Olive Green.
 BR Standard Mixed-Traffic Black livery with red and white lining(current livery).
 LSWR passenger Yellow Ochre/Brown livery with the initials 'LSW' on the water tank sides.

Gallery

See also
List of Isle of Wight-based O2 Class locomotives

References

External links 
 

0-4-4T locomotives
Individual locomotives of Great Britain
O02 W24
O02
Railway locomotives introduced in 1891
Standard gauge steam locomotives of Great Britain